Bryan Harkin (born October 29, 1980 in Derry) is a Northern Irish soccer player who plays for Crystal Palace Baltimore in the USSF Second Division.

Career

College and amateur
Harkin played college soccer at Fairfield University in Fairfield, Connecticut from 1999-2002.  In 2000, he set the Stags' single season assist record with 9 while helping lead the team to a No. 15 national ranking, and in 2002 he was selected as a Regional All-American by the NSCAA.

During his college years Harkin also played for the Cape Cod Crusaders in the USL Premier Development League, helping the team win the PDL National Championship in 2002.

Professional
Harkin signed for Crystal Palace Baltimore prior to the team's inaugural season in 2007, and has been ever-present since then, making 50 appearances for the club in USL Second Division and U.S. Open Cup play, and helping the team to the post-season playoffs in 2008.

Coaching
Harkin coached the women's varsity team at Mount St. Mary's University for three years while gaining an MBA in business.

On August 24, 2009, Harkin was named a volunteer assistant coach for the men's soccer team at Loyola University Maryland. In Fall of 2014, Harkin joined Tufts Men's Soccer coaching staff as an assistant coach. He helped the Jumbos to their first ever DIII National Championship in 2014, a Sweet Sixteen appearance in 2015 and a second National Championship in 2016. Harkin was also honored as the National Coaching staff of the year in 2014 & 2016 by the NSCAA. In Fall of 2017, Harkin was named head coach for the men's soccer team at Emerson College.

Career statistics
(correct as of 4 March 2010)

References

External links
Loyola coaching bio

1980 births
Living people
Association footballers from Northern Ireland
Fairfield Stags men's soccer players
USL Second Division players
Crystal Palace Baltimore players
Cape Cod Crusaders players
American soccer coaches
USL League Two players
Association football midfielders
Expatriate sportspeople from Northern Ireland in the United States
Expatriate association footballers from Northern Ireland
Expatriate soccer players in the United States